Everett Dawkins (born June 13, 1990) is a former American football defensive tackle. He was drafted by the Minnesota Vikings in the seventh round of the 2013 NFL Draft. He played college football at Florida State. Dawkins has also been a member of the Dallas Cowboys, Tampa Bay Buccaneers, New York Giants, Tampa Bay Storm, Brooklyn Bolts, and Washington Valor.

High school career
A native of Spartanburg, South Carolina, Dawkins attended James F. Byrnes High School in Duncan, where he was an All-State defensive lineman. Driven by an offense that included running back Marcus Lattimore, the Rebels capped a 15–0 season with a state championship in 2007. From his defensive end position, Dawkins contributed 115 tackles, including 14 sacks and five fumble recoveries. After his senior season concluded, he was invited to Max Emfinger's All-American Bowl Classic in Jackson, Mississippi, where he recorded five sacks and double-digit tackles, and to the 71st annual Shrine Bowl game.

Regarded as a four-star recruit by Rivals.com, Dawkins was ranked as the No. 8 weakside defensive end prospects in his class. With offers also from South Carolina, Illinois, Michigan State, Tennessee, and Virginia Tech, Dawkins committed to the Seminoles on November 17, 2007.

College career
Dawkins was a two-year starter at defensive tackle for Florida State.

Professional career

Minnesota Vikings
Dawkins was released by the Vikings on August 31, 2013 (along with 18 others) to get to a 53-man roster and signed to the practice squad the next day.

Dallas Cowboys
On November 6, 2013, Dawkins was signed off of Minnesota's practice squad by the Dallas Cowboys. He was released on November 26, 2013.

Tampa Bay Buccaneers
On June 13, 2014, Dawkins was released by the Buccaneers.

New York Giants
On August 26, 2014, Dawkins was cut by the Giants.

Washington Valor
Dawkins was assigned to the Washington Valor on January 9, 2017.

References

External links
NFL Draft bio
Florida State Seminoles football bio
Underdog Kids Foundation website

1990 births
Living people
Sportspeople from Spartanburg, South Carolina
Players of American football from South Carolina
American football defensive tackles
Florida State Seminoles football players
Minnesota Vikings players
Dallas Cowboys players
Tampa Bay Buccaneers players
New York Giants players
Tampa Bay Storm players
Brooklyn Bolts players
Washington Valor players